Russ Hogue (born December 26, 1974) is an American kickboxer from Belleville, Illinois. He started training in martial arts under three time world kickboxing champion Jim Boucher in Belleville, Illinois. He was also a member of a National Karate competition team with other notable athletes such as Bridgett Riley (World Boxing/Kickboxing Champion), Patrick Riley (mixed martial arts champion), Donny Reinhardt (North American Kickboxing Champion).

He won the St. Louis Golden Gloves title in 1993 and 1994 along with several other kickboxing titles: KICK MO State Champion, USA-KIA MO State Champion (2 weight classes), WKF and IKA United States Champion.

Throughout the late 1980s and early 1990s he was a successful karate competitor, winning several national karate tournaments for a period of 4 years, he was the #1 ranked sparring competitor in the region. He was also an alternate member of the 1991 Pan Am Games Karate Team.

In February 2007 he was inducted into the MMA Hall of Fame  with Bridgett Riley and Patrick Riley. He was awarded his 5th degree blackbelt by Grand Master Rich Osborn - List of Certified Blackbelts.

Post Fight Career
Russ retired in 2002. He graduated from Southern Illinois University with a bachelor's degree in Management Information Systems. With a focus on building a successful business and academic career he completed a Masters in Business Administration from the University of Phoenix (St. Louis, MO) in 2003. In 2015, he earned the doctor of philosophy (PhD) in Organizational Psychology from Walden University (Minneapolis, MN). His academic research has focused on leadership and building successful virtual teams . In 2021, he graduated from Harvard Extension School with a Master of Liberal Arts in Extension Studies in Journalism.

He has also had a successful career working for the largest I.T. organizations in the world (IBM, Microsoft and Dell) with a focus on enabling technologies that support the virtual workforce.

References 
Hostetler, Les: "The Tribune", page 1. Herald Publications, April 21, 1994 
MMASC - List of Certified Blackbelts
Hall of Fame - 
Doctoral Research Publication - 

1974 births
Living people
American male kickboxers
Kickboxers from Illinois
Heavyweight kickboxers
American male karateka
Walden University (Minnesota) alumni
University of Phoenix alumni
Southern Illinois University alumni
Harvard Extension School alumni